The 7th IAAF World Athletics Final was held at the Kaftanzoglio Stadium in Thessaloniki, Greece on September 12 and September 13, 2009. The competition represented the culmination of the 2009 IAAF World Athletics Tour, a selection of athletics meetings which began on September 20, 2008 at the Shanghai Golden Grand Prix. The Hellenic Amateur Athletic Association (SEGAS) won the rights to hold the event in April 2008.

The competitors in each event were decided by the final standings of the 2009 World Athletics Tour. Having scored points for their performances at specified meetings throughout the season, the seven athletes with the most points in each event qualified to compete, while eleven athletes were selected for races of 1500 metres and above. One additional athlete, a wildcard, was allocated to each event by the IAAF and replacement athletes were admitted to take the place of qualified athletes who could not attend the final.

Results

Men

Women

References

External links
Official website
Official 2009 IAAF World Athletics Final Site
2009 World Athletics Tour – Final points standings

World Athletics Final
A
IAAF World Athletics Final
International athletics competitions hosted by Greece
Sports competitions in Thessaloniki